This is a list of those who have held the position of Lord Lieutenant of South Yorkshire:

The post was created on 1 April 1974, covering the new metropolitan county of South Yorkshire.  This area had previously been covered by the West Riding lieutenancy.

There is also one Vice Lord Lieutenant and a host of Deputy Lord Lieutenants.

Lord Lieutenants

1974 – 1985: Gerard F Young CBE
1985 – 1996: J. Hugh Neill CBE TD
1996 – 2003: Richard A Lumley, 12th Earl of Scarbrough 
2004 – 2015: David B Moody CVO
2015 – 2021: Andrew J Coombe, CVO
November 2021: Professor Dame Hilary Chapman, DBE

Vice Lord Lieutenants

1981–1990: Roger Inman, OBE (mil), TD.DL
1990-1996: Richard A Lumley, 12th Earl of Scarbrough DL
1997-2010: Peter W Lee CBE DL
2010-2016: Dr R J G Bloomer OBE DL
Current: John R Holt DL

See also
List of lord lieutenants in the United Kingdom

References

South Yorkshire
History of South Yorkshire
 
1974 establishments in England